Jumonville is a United Methodist camp and retreat center located in Fayette County, Pennsylvania near Uniontown, PA.

People
George Jumonville (1917–1996), American Major League Baseball player
J. E. Jumonville, Jr. (born 1942), American politician from Louisiana and a horse breeder
J. E. Jumonville, Sr. (1919–1983), American politician from Louisiana and a horse breeder

de Jumonville 
Joseph Coulon de Jumonville (1718–1754), French Canadian military officer

See also
Battle of Jumonville Glen, also known as the Jumonville affair, the opening battle of the French and Indian War[5] fought on May 28, 1754, near what is present-day Hopwood and Uniontown in Fayette County, Pennsylvania